Anthony S. Marsella (born December 13, 1947) is an American politician who served in the New Jersey General Assembly from the 4th Legislative District from 1982 to 1992.

References

1947 births
Living people
Democratic Party members of the New Jersey General Assembly